Thyone can refer to:

An alternative name for Semele in Greek mythology
Thyone (moon), a moon of Jupiter
Thyone (echinoderm), a genus of sea cucumbers
A synonym for the moth genus Asaphodes Walker, 1862